Blackfriars Railway Bridge is a railway bridge crossing the River Thames in London, between Blackfriars Bridge and the Millennium Bridge.

First bridge
There have been two structures with the name. The first bridge was opened in 1864 and was designed by Joseph Cubitt for the London, Chatham and Dover Railway. Massive abutments at each end carried the railway's insignia, preserved and restored on the south side. Following the formation of the Southern Railway in 1924, inter-city and continental services were concentrated on Waterloo, and St Paul's Station became a local and suburban stop. For this reason, the use of the original bridge gradually declined. It eventually became too weak to support modern trains, and was therefore removed in 1985 – all that remains is a series of columns crossing the Thames and the southern abutment, which is a Grade II listed structure.

Second bridge
The second bridge, built slightly further downstream (to the east), was originally called St Paul's Railway Bridge and opened in 1886. It was designed by John Wolfe-Barry and Henry Marc Brunel and is made of wrought iron. It was built by Lucas and Aird. When St Paul's railway station changed its name to Blackfriars in 1937 the name of the bridge was changed as well.

At the southern end of the bridge was Blackfriars Bridge railway station which opened in 1864 before closing to passengers in 1885 following the opening of what is today the main Blackfriars station. Blackfriars Bridge railway station continued as a goods stop until 1964 when it was completely demolished, and much of it redeveloped into offices.

As part of the Thameslink Programme, the platforms at Blackfriars station have been extended across the Thames and partially supported by the 1864 bridge piers. The project is designed by Will Alsop and built by Balfour Beatty. The work also includes the installation of a roof covered with photovoltaic solar panels. It is the largest of only three solar bridges in the world (the others being Kennedy Bridge in Bonn, Germany, and Kurilpa Bridge in Australia). Other green improvements include sun pipes and systems to collect rain water.

See also
List of crossings of the River Thames
List of bridges in London

References

External links
 
 

Railway bridges in London
Bridges completed in 1886
Bridges in the City of London
Buildings and structures in the London Borough of Southwark
Transport in the London Borough of Southwark
Bridges across the River Thames
Bridge light displays